Pagoi is a village in the northwestern part of Corfu Island in Greece, and a community of the municipal unit Agios Georgios. The community consists of the villages Pagoi, Agios Georgios, Prinylas, and Vatonies. The community had a population of 511 as of the 2011 census.

Villages

Pagoi
The village Pagoi had 304 inhabitants at the 2011 census.

Agios Georgios Pagon 
The village Agios Georgios Pagon had 68 inhabitants at the 2011 census. It was developed as a tourist resort in the third quarter of the 20th century. It has a few old buildings, including the Saint George church and the Tsimpougis house. Ruins of an older settlement that was destroyed by a landslide are situated on the beach.

Prinylas
The village Prinylas had 70 inhabitants at the 2011 census. The village is built in a panoramic setting above Agios Georgios Bay. It was the seat of the Byzantine Decarch, as mentioned in 1200. A common last name is Gialopsos. It is a settlement with characteristic streets, houses, and archives from the 17th century. Prinyla is a well-preserved village and has a church, Agios Nikolaos, that was constructed in the 14th century.

Vatonies 
The village Vatonies had 69 inhabitants at the 2011 census. Vatonies has a church, Agion Apostolon, and a tavern.

Use in James Bond film
The area was used as a filming location in the 1981 James Bond film For Your Eyes Only, where Bond (played by Roger Moore) and Melina Havelock (Carole Bouquet) fled from villains in their yellow Citroen 2CV.

Last names
Common last names of the area are:
 Payatakis (probably from Crete 17th century)
 Romeo (probably from ancient Italy or Crete 17th century)
 Ruva (probably from ancient Italy or Crete 17th century)
 Sinadinos (probably from Sinada in minor Asia 13th century)

References

External links
Main page from the Corfu Prefecture 

Populated places in Corfu (regional unit)